Louis-Honoré Fréchette,  (November 16, 1839 – May 31, 1908), was a Canadian poet, politician, playwright, and short story writer. For his prose, he would be the first Quebecois to receive the Prix Montyon from the Académie française, as well as the first Canadian to receive any honor of this kind from a European nation.

Early life and education
Born in Lévis, Lower Canada, from 1854 to 1860 Fréchette did his classical studies at the Séminaire de Québec, the Collège de Sainte-Anne-de-la-Pocatière and at the Séminaire de Nicolet. Fréchette first showed his rebelliousness when he studied at college. He later studied law at Université Laval.

Career

In 1864, he opened a lawyer's office in Lévis where he founded two newspapers: Le drapeau de Lévis and La Tribune de Levis. He exiled himself in Chicago where he wrote La voix d'un exilé.  A number of plays which he wrote during that period were lost in the Great Chicago Fire.

Fréchette returned to Quebec in 1871, where he was a Liberal candidate for Lévis in the provincial elections that year; he was not elected. However, in 1874 he was elected Member of Parliament in Ottawa. He served in the House of Commons of Canada from 1874 to 1878 as the Liberal Party of Canada member from Lévis.He was not re-elected in 1878. After that, he moved to Montreal where he began writing full-time, having inherited the wealth of his aunt when she died.

He was the first Quebecer to receive the Montyon Prize of the Académie française for his collection of poems Les Fleurs boréales, les oiseaux de neige (1879).

In 1881, he was given an honorary LLD by Queen's College, Kingston.  In that same year Fréchette would meet Mark Twain in Montreal, whose writing he had much admired; indeed the two would remain friends, exchanging works and favorite books. In the following year Twain would toast Fréchette at an American welcoming banquet in Holyoke, joking about his regard for the translation of works that in his fictitious "translation his [Fréchette's] pathetic poems have naturally become humorous, his humorous poems have become sad. Anybody who knows even the rudiments of arithmetic will know that Monsieur Fréchette's poems are now worth exactly twice as much as they were before."
In 1897 Fréchette was made a Companion of the Order of St Michael and St George. After his death in 1908, he was entombed at the Notre Dame des Neiges Cemetery in Montreal.

Canada Post issued a postage stamp in his honour on July 7, 1989.

In 1991, Louis Honoré Fréchette Public School, a French immersion, opened in Thornhill, Ontario.

Electoral record

Notable works

Poetry
 La voix d'un exilé (1866)
 La découverte du Mississippi (1873)
 Pêle-mêle (1877)
 La Légende d'un peuple (1877)
Poésies choisies (1879)
 Les Fleurs boréales, les oiseaux de neige (1879)
 Quebec (1887)

Short stories
 L'Iroquoise du lac Saint-Pierre (1861)
 Originaux et détraqués (1892), based on real life characters
 Les contes de Jos Violon
 Christmas in French Canada (1899)

Plays
 Le retour de l'exilé (1880)
 Papineau (1880)
 La retour de l'exilé (1880)
 Félix Poutré (1892)

Archives 
There is a Louis-Honoré Fréchette fonds at Library and Archives Canada. Archival reference number is R8032. There is also a Louis-Honoré Fréchette fonds at Bibliothèque et Archives nationales du Québec.

References

Bibliography
 W. H. New, ed. Encyclopedia of Literature in Canada. Toronto: University of Toronto Press, 2002: 395–97.

External links 

 
 
  
 
 Notice biographique de Louis Fréchette at L'Île (in French)
 
 Louis-Honoré Fréchette's entry in The Canadian Encyclopedia

1839 births
1908 deaths
19th-century Canadian poets
Canadian male poets
Canadian Companions of the Order of St Michael and St George
19th-century Canadian dramatists and playwrights
Writers from Quebec
Canadian poets in French
Liberal Party of Canada MPs
Members of the House of Commons of Canada from Quebec
Persons of National Historic Significance (Canada)
Canadian dramatists and playwrights in French
Canadian male dramatists and playwrights
19th-century male writers
Université Laval alumni
Burials at Notre Dame des Neiges Cemetery